Sorter may refer to:
 Sorter (logistics), a system that sorts products according to destination
 Card sorter, a machine to sort computer punched card
 Cash sorter machine, a machine used for sorting banknotes
 Coin sorter, a machine used for sorting coins
 Keirsey Temperament Sorter, a self-assessed personality questionnaire
 Sorting algorithm, an algorithm to put elements of a list into order

See also
 Sort (disambiguation)